Bolin is a surname. Notable people with the surname include:

Bert Bolin (1925–2007), Swedish meteorologist
Bob Bolin (born 1939), American Major League Baseball pitcher
Charles E. Bolin (1843–1924), American politician
Jane Bolin (1908–2007), American judge
James E. Bolin (1914–2002), American politician and judge
Liu Bolin (1973-) Chinese performance artist "The Invisible Man"
Oscar Ray Bolin (1962–2016), American serial killer
Rolf Ling Bolin (1901–1973), American academic ichthyologist
Shannon Bolin (1917–2016), American actress and singer
Tommy Bolin (1951–1976), American guitarist and songwriter
Wesley Bolin (1909–1978), American politician

See also
 Bolin (The Legend of Korra), a major character in the animated series The Legend of Korra
 Boline (knife)
 Boleyn, a surname
 Bohlin, a surname
 Bowline, a knot